Lucas Manuel Gaday Orozco (born 20 February 1993) is an Argentine racing cyclist, who most recently rode for Uruguayan amateur team CC Alas Rojas. He rode at the 2014 UCI Road World Championships.

Major results

2013
 7th Road race, Pan American Under-23 Road Championships
2014
 2nd Road race, National Under-23 Road Championships
2015
 1st Gran Premio della Liberazione
 3rd  Road race, Pan American Under-23 Road Championships
 8th Road race, UCI Under-23 Road World Championships
 10th La Côte Picarde
2018
 3rd Road race, National Road Championships
2022
 8th Overall Vuelta a Formosa Internacional
1st Stage 1

References

External links
 

1993 births
Living people
Argentine male cyclists
Cyclists from Buenos Aires
21st-century Argentine people